Georg "Jojje" Wadenius (born 4 May 1945) is a Swedish multi-instrumentalist, singer, and composer who was particularly active during the 1970s and 1980s as a studio and session guitarist and bassist, as well as for a series of albums of children's songs in Sweden.

Biography
Wadenius was born in Stockholm, Sweden, where he attended Adolf Fredrik's Music School. In 1979, he joined The Saturday Night Live Band on television. He stayed on until 1985 and has since worked for many important artists as a session player and/or touring musician, among them Steely Dan, Aretha Franklin, Diana Ross, Dr. John, David Sanborn, James Brown, Marianne Faithfull, Kent, Paul Simon, Joe Thomas, Dionne Warwick, Roberta Flack, Donald Fagen, Doug Katsaros, Michael Franks, and Luther Vandross, as well as many important artists in Sweden.

In 1970, he received a Swedish Grammis for Made in Sweden and another for his work on children's songs.

Later in his career, he produced other Scandinavian performers, including Anne Sofie von Otter, and in 2001 he set up a recording studio in Oslo, Norway.

Discography

As leader
1969 - Goda, Goda
1978 - Puss,Puss,Sant,Sant
1978 - Georg Wadenius
1987 - Cleo
1997 - Till alla barn
1997 - Left turn from the right lane
1999 - Zzoppa
2005 - Interloop
2009 - Jul på Svenska
2010 - Reconnection
2011 - Saleya
2012 - Teddy og Marian
2013 - Jul på Norska
2014 - Psalmer
2014 - Cleo, Vol. 2
2016 - Cleo with friends
2016 - Farvel
2016 - Livet är nu
2016 - Jojjes klassiska barnvisor
2018 - Jojjes Wadenius bästa barnvisor, Vol. 1

With Made in Sweden
1968 - Made in Sweden (with Love)
1969 - Snakes in a Hole
1970 - Live! At the Golden Circle
1970 - Made in England
1970 - Regnbågslandet
1971 - Best of
1976 - Where Do We Begin

With Blood, Sweat & Tears
1972 - New Blood
1973 - No Sweat
1974 - Mirror Image
1975 - New City

As guest
 Ja, Dä Ä Dä (1969) - Pugh Rogefeldt
 Ramadan (1969) - Björn J:son Lindh
 Rune At The Top (1969) - Rune Gustafsson
 Taube (1969) - Cornelis Vreewijk
 Poem, Blues Och Ballader (1969) - Cornelis Vreeswijk
 När Dimman Lättar (1969) - Berndt Staf
 Jason's Fleece (1970) - Björn J:son Lindh
 Solar Plexus (1971) - 
 Monica, Monica (1971) - Monica Zetterlund
 Huvva (1971) Merit Hemmingson
 Goda, Goda (DK) (1971) - Trille
 Black Is The Color (1972) - Joe Henderson
 Songs (1973) - B.J. Thomas
 Funky Formula (1976) - Slim Borgudd
 The Poet (1976) - Olli Ahvenlahti
 E.K. (1976) - Eero Koivistoinen
 Move (1977) - Rune Gustafsson
 Sansara Music Band (1977) - Sansara
 It's A Long Story (1977) - Brian Chapman
 Nyspolat (1977) - Coste Apetrea
 The Mathematician's Air Display (1977) - Pekka Pohjola
 Hoven, Droven (1977) - Merit Hemmingson
 Spelar Nilsson (1978) - De Gladas Kapell
 Live & More (1980) - Roberta Flack and Peabo Bryson
 Dreams (1980) - Grace Slick
 Never Too Much (1981) - Luther Vandross
 Forever, for Always, for Love (1982) - Luther Vandross
 Busy Body (1983) - Luther Vandross
 Get It Right (1983) - Aretha Franklin
 Born To Love (1983) - Peabo Bryson and Roberta Flack
 Success (1983) - The Weather Girls
  Live From New York (1984) - The Saturday Night Live Band
 How Many Times Can We Say Goodbye (1984) - Dionne Warwick and Luther Vandross
 Swept Away (1985) - Diana Ross
 Passion Fruit (1985) - Ronnie Cuber
 Night I Fell In Love (1985) - Luther Vandross
 Gloria Loring (1986) - Gloria Loring
 The Camera Never Lies (1987) - Michael Franks
 Distant Drums (1987 - Brian Slawson
 Family Vacation (1987) - Rosenschontz
 Energia (1989 - Valerie Lynch
 Collection (1989) - New York Voices
 Johnny Gill (1990) - Johnny Gill
 So Intense (1991) - Lisa Fischer
 Hearts Of Fire (1991) - New York Voices
 That Time Again (1991) - Kevin Owens
 Jigsaw (1991) - Jeremy Steig
 Only Human (1991) - Jeffrey Osborne
 Make Time For Love (1991) - Keith Washington
 Time For Love (1991) - Freddie Jackson
 Kamakiriad (1993) - Donald Fagen
 Scene Is Clean (1993) Ronnie Cuber
 Paul Jabara Friends (1993) - Paul Jabara
 Television (1994) - Dr. John
 Pure Pleasure (1994) - Phil Perry
 Alive in America (1995) - Steely Dan
 Gravity (1995) - Howard Johnson
 Mr. X (1996) - Jason Miles
 All That I Am (1997) - Joe Thomas
 Endless Is Love (1997) - Jon Lucien
 Bortom Det Blå (1997) - Lisa Ekdahl
 Show Me The Meaning Of Being Lonely (1999) - Backstreet Boys
 Julemorgen (1999) - Nissa Nyberget
 Port Of Call (2000) - Silje Nergaard
 Djävulen Och Ängeln (2000) - Tomas Ledin
 Soul Ballads (2001) - Sigvart Dagsland
 At First Light (2001) - Silje Nergaard
 Vapen & ammunition (2002) - Kent
 Visor (2002) - Helen Sjöholm
 Nightwatch (2003) - Silje Nergaard
 Irreplaceable (2003) - George Benson
 Life (2003) - Leif Johansen
 Taube (2003) - Per Myrberg
 Når Dagen Roper (2004) - Anne Grete Preus
 Det Føles Bra (2005) - Jan Eggum
 Be Still My Heart - The Essential (2005) - Silje Nergaard
 Här Är Den sköna sommaren (2006) - Lill Lindfors
 No Vil Eg Vake Med Deg (2006) - Hilde Louise Asbjørnsen
 I Let The Music Speak (2006) - AnnSofie von Otter
 In The Moment (2007) - Jazzcode
 Hjerteknuser (2007) - Jan Eggum

References

External links 
 Official site

1945 births
Living people
20th-century American bass guitarists
American male bass guitarists
American people of Swedish descent
American rhythm and blues bass guitarists
American rock guitarists
American session musicians
American soul guitarists
Blood, Sweat & Tears members
Musicians from Stockholm
Saturday Night Live Band members
Swedish guitarists
Male guitarists
20th-century American male musicians
Swedish male musicians